The Broad Convergence for the Salvation of Angola – Electoral Coalition (CASA–CE) is a political alliance in Angola that currently includes five parties.

History
The alliance was formed in March 2012 by Abel Chivukuvuku after he left UNITA and initially comprised 4 parties: the Angolan Free Alliance Majority Party (PALMA), the Party for Democracy and Development in Angola-Patriotic Alliance (PADDA-AP), the Angolan Pacific Party (PPA) and the National Salvation Party of Angola (PNSA).  CASA–CE won eight seats in the 2012 National Assembly elections, making it the third largest faction in the National Assembly after the MPLA and UNITA. Ahead of the 2017 elections the Democratic Bloc (BD) and the Democratic Party for the Progress of the National Alliance of Angola (PDP–ANA) joined the alliance, that ended up doubling its representation to 16 seats.

In 2019 following an internal crisis its founder Abel Chivukuvuku was  dismissed as leader and excluded from the alliance, with the leader of PADDA–AP André Mendes de Carvalho "Miau" taking its place. Two years later the leader of PALMA Manuel Fernandes taking was elected as a new leader by the coalition members. Later in 2021 BD announced its intention not to join again the coalition for the following legislative election, leading to the suspension of its membership. In the 2022 Angolan general election the coalition lost all its seats.

Composition
CASA–CE is composed of the following parties:

Current members

Former members

Election results

Presidential elections

National Assembly elections

References

External links

2012 establishments in Angola
Political parties established in 2012
Political party alliances in Angola